Keith Gregory Brooks (30 July 1888 – 29 August 1955) was an Australian politician.

He was born in Newcastle to ship owner Thomas Brooks and Emily Elizabeth Lowe. He attended Sydney Church of England Grammar School and spent a year as a jackaroo before opening an export and import business in 1909. From 1910 to 1913 he was a Newcastle alderman. On 1 July 1916 he married Hilda Constance Brand, with whom he had a daughter. From 1939 to 1946 he was a member of the New South Wales Legislative Council, representing the United Australia Party and then the Liberal Party. Brooks died at Wahroonga in 1955.

References

1888 births
1955 deaths
United Australia Party members of the Parliament of New South Wales
Liberal Party of Australia members of the Parliament of New South Wales
Members of the New South Wales Legislative Council
20th-century Australian politicians